Manma is the district headquarter of Kalikot District in Karnali Province, Nepal, a landlocked country of South Asia. The town is located at 29°8'60N 81°37'0E and has an altitude of 2033 metres.

At the time of the 1991 Nepal census it had a population of 4409 people residing in 877 individual households.

Media
To Promote local culture Manma has one FM radio station Radio Malika - 102.8 MHz Which is a Community radio Station.

See also
Nepal
 Kalikot District

References

Populated places in Kalikot District